Calister Ubah (born 15 November 1973) is a Nigerian sprinter. She competed in the women's 200 metres at the 1996 Summer Olympics.

References

External links
 

1973 births
Living people
Athletes (track and field) at the 1996 Summer Olympics
Nigerian female sprinters
Olympic athletes of Nigeria
Place of birth missing (living people)
Olympic female sprinters
20th-century Nigerian women